Harlequin is a collaborative studio album by American pianist Dave Grusin and American guitarist Lee Ritenour, released in 1985 through GRP Records. The album reached No. 2 on Billboard's Contemporary Jazz chart, and earned a 1986 Grammy Award for Best Arrangement on an Instrumental for "Early A.M. Attitude". Harlequin also earned Grammy nominations for Best Engineered Recording, Best Instrumental Arrangement Accompanying Vocals, and Best Pop Instrumental Performance. In 1988, Perri sisters sampled Grusin’s “The Bird” into their track called “The Flight”, from their album “The Flight” under Zebra Records, that song was produced by Michael J. Powell.

Track listing

Personnel
 Dave Grusin – keyboards, conductor
 Lee Ritenour – guitar
 Ivan Lins – vocals
 Jimmy Johnson – bass
 Abraham Laboriel – bass
 Carlos Vega – drums
 Harvey Mason – drums
 Paulinho Da Costa – percussion
 Alex Acuña – percussion

Charts

References

External links
Dave Grusin-Harlequin at Discogs
Dave Grusin-Harlequin at AllMusic

1985 albums
GRP Records albums
Dave Grusin albums